Ramiz Firudin oglu Tahirov (born 1966) is an Azerbaijani military officer, serving as the lieutenant general in the Azerbaijani Armed Forces. He is the Commander of the Azerbaijani Air Forces and Air Defence and the Deputy Minister of Defence of Azerbaijan since May 2014. Tahirov had taken part in the 2020 Nagorno-Karabakh war.

Early life 
Ramiz Firudin oglu Tahirov was born on 16 April 1966, in Ordzhonikidze, the capital of the North Ossetian ASSR, which was then part of the RSFSR, Soviet Union. He graduated from the Military Lyceum named after Jamshid Nakchivanski in 1983. Later, Tahirov continued his education at the Kiev Higher Anti-Aircraft Missile Engineering School and was graduated in 1988. From 1988 to 1992, he served in the Soviet Armed Forces at the Vasilevsky Military Academy of Army Air Defence Forces and in the military representation of the USSR. In 1992–2002, he served in the Armed Forces of the Republic of Azerbaijan. In 2002–2013, he worked as Deputy Assistant to the President of the Republic of Azerbaijan for defence issues.

Military service

Personal life 
Ramiz Tahirov is married and has two children.

Awards 
 Tahirov was awarded the Zafar Order in 2020, by the order of the President Aliyev.

References 

1966 births
Living people
People from Vladikavkaz
Azerbaijani generals
Azerbaijani military personnel of the 2020 Nagorno-Karabakh war